Daniel "Dan" Conness Clawson (18 August 1948 – 7 May 2019) was an American sociologist, professor, and activist. Clawson was Professor of Sociology at the University of Massachusetts, Amherst and former executive committee member of the Massachusetts Teachers Association, the Massachusetts affiliate of the National Education Association.

Life
Clawson was born 18 August 1948 in Alexandria, Virginia but was raised in Chevy Chase, Maryland. Clawson first attended Carleton College but later transferred to Washington University in St. Louis where he graduated in 1970. Clawson attended Students for a Democratic Society meetings at Washington University though he did not join the organization. At Washington University, Clawson met George Rawick who later came to be his mentor. Rawick, who had associated with Marxist intellectuals C.L.R. James and Martin Glaberman in Detroit, became an early influence on Clawson's politics and thought as the two read and studied Karl Marx's Das Kapital together. For his doctoral studies, Clawson attended Stony Brook University and completed a dissertation under the supervision of Michael Schwartz.

On May 7, 2019, Clawson died of a heart attack. Clawson was married to Mary Ann Clawson, professor of sociology emeritus at Wesleyan University and father to Laura Clawson, a sociologist and editor at the Daily Kos.

Activism
Over and above his academic work, Clawson was a labor activist, member of the Massachusetts Teachers Association, and former president of the Massachusetts Society of Professors. In addition to his union work, Clawson also served in leadership roles in numerous progressive organizations. Clawson was the former president of the Scholars, Artists, and Writers for Social Justice (SAWSJ), an American organization founded to produce dialog among scholars, artists, and unions, and a founding member of the Public Higher Education Network of Massachusetts (PHENOM), a grass-roots organization advocating for free higher education in the state of Massachusetts.

Academic career
Clawson's entire professorial career was spent at the University of Massachusetts, Amherst where he also held an appointment at the university's Center for Research on Families. Clawson also served as a visiting scholar at the Russell Sage Foundation from 2011 to 2012. Clawson also served as an editor for two American Sociological Association publications, including Contemporary Sociology from 1995 to 1997 and to the Association's Rose Series from 2000 to 2005.

The Next Upsurge: Labor and the New Social Movements
Clawson's The Next Upsurge: Labor and the New Social Movements was published in 2003. The book was the subject of two review symposiums, one in Critical Sociology and a second in Labor History. The Next Upsurge contributes to debates on the causes for the fall in labor union membership in the United States in the second half of the twentieth century, as well as strategies for revitalizing membership growth. Clawson first argues that union membership in the United States has in the past expanded in momentary periods of accelerated growth, not incrementally, and often in tandem with other social movements. Clawson argues that part of the explanation for the decline of American organized labor was its failure to ally with one such moment of societal unrest manifested in the social movements of the 1960s, and that in order for labor unions to grow in membership again they must build solidarity with other contemporary progressive social movements. The Next Upsurge argues that to do this the American labor movement must reject business unionism and instead embrace social movement unionism in the form of greater rank and file membership control and prioritize social justice.

Bibliography

Solely authored books

Co-authored books

Edited books

Co-edited books

References

External links 
 

1948 births
2019 deaths
Carleton College alumni
Stony Brook University alumni
University of Massachusetts Amherst faculty
American sociologists
Washington University in St. Louis alumni
Writers from Alexandria, Virginia
National Education Association people
Deaths in Massachusetts